Willow Springs School District 108 is a school district headquartered in Willow Springs, Illinois, in the Chicago metropolitan area. It serves Willow Springs and unincorporated areas with Justice, Illinois addresses. It has a single school, Willow Springs School, which was initially located in a school building with four rooms. It began occupying its current site in the 1920s and the school building received an addition on its west side in 2005; this addition added main offices, computer labs, and a learning resource center.

References

External links
 

School districts in Cook County, Illinois
1920s establishments in Illinois